John "Jack" Young was a professional association footballer who played in the Southern Football League for Bristol Rovers.

He was signed from Kilmarnock in May 1906, where he had become known as a clever and pacey forward, and spent the 1906–07 season with Bristol Rovers before leaving them to join Notts County in 1907.

He was Bristol Rovers' top goalscorer during his only season with them, with fourteen goals.

References

Year of birth missing
Year of death missing
Footballers from East Ayrshire
Scottish footballers
Association football forwards
Kilmarnock F.C. players
Bristol Rovers F.C. players
Notts County F.C. players
Southern Football League players